"Keep a Lid on Things" is a song by Canadian group Crash Test Dummies and was the first single from their 1999 album Give Yourself a Hand.  The song featured a new sound for the group, most notably Brad Roberts using falsetto vocals.

Track listing
Lyrics written by Brad Roberts. Music written by Brad Roberts and Greg Wells.

"Keep a Lid on Things" - 2:44
"Filter Queen" - 2:55
"Handy Candyman" - 3:00

Music video

The music video for the song features Brad Roberts driving robot versions of the band and having to leave on a jetpack to locate a new battery. The video was filmed in Toronto in December 1998. The video premiered on MuchMusic on February 8, 1999.

Charts

Weekly charts

Year-end charts

References

1999 singles
Crash Test Dummies songs
Songs written by Greg Wells
Song recordings produced by Greg Wells
Songs written by Brad Roberts
1999 songs